The 1997 Volvo Women's Open was a women's tennis tournament played on outdoor hard courts in Pattaya in Thailand that was part of Tier IV of the 1997 WTA Tour.  It was the seventh edition of the tournament and was held from 17 November through 23 November 1997. Fourth-seeded Henrieta Nagyová won the singles title.

Finals

Singles

 Henrieta Nagyová defeated  Dominique Van Roost 7–5, 6–7, 7–5
 It was Nagyová's 2nd title of the year and the 3rd of her career.

Doubles

 Kristine Kunce /  Corina Morariu defeated  Florencia Labat /  Dominique Van Roost 6–3, 6–4
 It was Kunce's 2nd title of the year and the 6th of her career. It was Morariu's only title of the year and the 1st of her career.

References

External links
 ITF tournament edition details
 Tournament draws

 
 WTA Tour
 in women's tennis
Tennis, WTA Tour, Volvo Women's Open
Tennis, WTA Tour, Volvo Women's Open

Tennis, WTA Tour, Volvo Women's Open